Andy Murray was the defending champion, and as the third seed won in the final 6–7(3–7), 6–4, 7–6(7–2), against unseeded Ivo Karlović.

Seeds

Main draw

Finals

Top half

Bottom half

External links
 Main draw
 Qualifying draw

Singles